Gülek Castle is a medieval castle in Mersin Province, Turkey.

Location
The castle is in the rural area of Tarsus ilçe (district) of Mersin Province.

History
Gülek Kalesi (Armenian: Kuklak; Arabic: Kawlāk) is a large fortification of considerable antiquity which retains evidence of Byzantine and Arab periods of occupation, but is primarily a construction of the 12th and 13th centuries attached to the Armenian Kingdom of Cilicia. Its circuit walls and towers at the south and west cover a distance of over 450 meters. An extensive photographic survey and plan of Gülek Castle was made between 1973 and 1979. Its name in the 12th century was Askaliba. In an Armenian document a certain Symbat was named as the lord of the castle. The castle was used to control the passage from Cilicia to Cappadocia and the passengers had to pay a certain sum to the lord of the castle. Later, the castle was captured by the Mamluks of Egypt and the Ottoman Empire. Ottomans obtained lead from the mines to the northwest of the castle. During the revolt of Mehmet Ali Pasha in the 19th century, the castle was used by İbrahim Pasha of Egypt, Mehmet Ali's son.

Description
The gate is at the south side. The castle walls are on the south and west side. The north and the east sides are protected by the natural sharp clifts. Most of the building material is  bossage type stones, typical of Armenian masonry. But there are also more recent ruins which resemble that of the Casemates of İbrahim Pasha (which are situated to the north of Gülek Castle).

Gallery

References

History of Mersin Province
Castles in Mersin Province
Tarsus District
Ruined castles in Turkey